The American Soldier is a 1970 West German film written and directed by Rainer Werner Fassbinder. The film stars Karl Scheydt as Ricky, a German-American Vietnam veteran, who takes a job as a hired assassin on behalf of three renegade policemen to do away with a number of undesirables in Munich.

Cast
 Karl Scheydt as Ricky
 Elga Sorbas as Rosa
 Jan George as Jan
 Hark Bohm as Doc
 Marius Aicher as Cop
 Margarethe von Trotta as Chambermaid
 Ulli Lommel as Gypsy
 Katrin Schaake as Magdalena Fuller
 Ingrid Caven as Bar Singer
 Eva Ingeborg Scholz as Ricky's mother
 Kurt Raab as Ricky's brother
 Irm Hermann as Whore
 Gustl Datz as Chief of police
 Rainer Werner Fassbinder as Franz Walsch

References

External links

1970 films
1970s avant-garde and experimental films
1970 crime films
German black-and-white films
Films directed by Rainer Werner Fassbinder
Films set in Munich
German gangster films
German avant-garde and experimental films
1970s German-language films
West German films
1970s German films